This is a list of locations in Canada which are reported to be haunted. Many have been featured by television programs such as Creepy Canada, The Girly Ghosthunters and Mystery Hunters. It is in alphabetical order by province or territory, then by the name of the location.

Alberta

 Banff Springs Hotel in Banff National Park is a reported location of multiple hauntings, including the ghosts of a young bride and a bellman.
 The Bowman Arts Centre in Lethbridge is reported to be haunted by the ghost of a young Chinese girl who was beaten to death in the women's restroom after being mistaken for a boy in traditional Chinese attire.
 The now-decommissioned Charles Camsell Hospital is regarded as one of Alberta's most haunted buildings. A former Jesuit College turned tuberculosis sanatorium, it was visited by the group Paranormal Explorers in 2005.
 Deane House in Calgary is reportedly haunted. It was built in 1906, and served as the official residence of Richard Burton Deane, the Superintendent of the Royal North West Mounted Police. It was featured on Creepy Canada.
 The Edmonton General Continuing Care Centre is a palliative care centre that is speculated to be a site of multiple hauntings.
 The Fairmont Hotel Macdonald in Edmonton is reported to be haunted, including a spectral horse that was dropped dead during the 1914 pouring of the building's foundation.
 The Firkins House of Fort Edmonton Park is considered to be the home of a ventriloquist doll that suddenly materializes in cupboards, as well as a spectral small boy. It was featured on Creepy Canada.

 Frank Slide in Crowsnest Pass was the site of a massive rockslide in 1903 that claimed 76 lives. Several of their bodies were never recovered.
 The old Grace Hospital in Calgary is reportedly haunted by the ghost of a woman named Maudine Riley, who died in childbirth, and whose family was believed to own the land when the hospital was being constructed. The hospital is still in operation.
 La Bohème Restaurant Bed and Breakfast in Edmonton. According to some employees, it is haunted by the spirit of a former owner's wife who was murdered in a jealous rage.
 McKay Avenue School in downtown Edmonton is a museum that previously served as a school. It was the scene of the first two legislative sessions of the province. One particular entity is the spirit of a worker who perished in a fall during the construction of the building.
 The old Princess Theatre in Edmonton is claimed to be haunted by a spectral bride who committed suicide by hanging in the 1920s after being cast off by her loved one.
 Strathcona Museum and Archives is a former RCMP detachment that is considered to be haunted.
 The abandoned Taber Hospital in Taber.
 Walterdale Playhouse in the district of Old Strathcona, Edmonton is reportedly haunted, most notably by the ghost of "Walt," who was an old volunteer firefighter.

British Columbia

 British Columbia Penitentiary in New Westminster. The former penitentiary was active for 102 years, until decommissioned during the 1980s. Little of the building's remnants are left, save for the Boot Hill graveyard.
 Craigdarroch Castle in Victoria. This historic mansion was constructed in the late 1800s as a family residence for the wealthy Scottish coal baron Robert Dunsmuir and his wife Joan. Robert died in April 1889, 17 months before construction on the castle was completed, and his sons Alexander and James took over the role of finishing the castle. Ghost sightings have been reported at this location.
 The Empress Hotel in downtown Victoria. One of the oldest hotels in the British Columbian capital, it was designed by Francis Rattenbury and opened in 1908. Undergoing two expansions (the first was in 1910-1912 and the second was in 1928), it welcomed several prominent personalities such as kings, queens, and movie personalities of the 1900s. However, the existence of multiple paranormal activities is possible, most notably the ghosts of the hotel's designer (who was murdered in 1935), a maid on the 6th floor, and a construction worker who killed himself.
 The Fairmont Hotel Vancouver in Downtown Vancouver. Opened in 1939, it is touted as one of Canada's grand railway hotels. It is allegedly haunted by a "lady in red", which is also said by believers to be the ghost of a Vancouver socialite named Jennie Pearl Cox.
 Hatley Castle in Colwood. This castle, now home to the public Royal Roads University, is considered to be haunted by a parlor maid named Annabelle, and James Dunsmuir's son, James Dunsmuir, Jr. It was featured by Creepy Canada.
 8/51  , a house in vancouver in neighberhood of rupert street is rumoured that a man killed his wife in that house in 1989 and the wifes spirit resides in a rocking chair 
 New Westminster Secondary School in New Westminster. One of the largest high schools in British Columbia, it witnessed the drowning of a boy in the basement pool in the early 1970s. That boy is claimed to haunt the high school.
 The Old Spaghetti Factory in the historic district of Gastown, Vancouver, is claimed to be haunted. Most notable is a phantom tram conductor that supposedly appears in an old trolley within the restaurant.

 Tranquille Sanatorium, located near Kamloops, is also considered by believers to be haunted. It opened in 1907 as a tuberculosis sanitorium, and witnessed the deaths of many of its patients.
 Vogue Theatre in Vancouver. Used for plays and concerts, it is reported to be haunted.
 Waterfront Station, the main transit terminus in Downtown Vancouver, is considered to be the "most haunted building in Vancouver", with multiple reports of apparitions and furniture moving on their own accord.

Manitoba

 Burton Cummings Theatre in Winnipeg. It was featured by Creepy Canada.
 Fort Garry Hotel in Winnipeg. Specifically, Room 202 is allegedly the spot where a woman committed suicide after knowing her husband perished in an automobile accident. One such believer was former Liberal MP Brenda Chamberlain. It was featured by Creepy Canada.
 Fort La Reine in Port la Prairie.
 La Barriere Park in the Rural Municipality of Ritchot.
 Mallard Lodge in Portage la Prairie. It was featured by Creepy Canada. 
 Royal Manitoba Theatre Centre in Winnipeg.
 St. Ignatius School in Winnipeg, said to be the witness of the death of a little girl due to accident while playing in the playground.
 St. Norbert Monastery, a former Trappist monastery in St. Norbert that was set ablaze in 1983, and is now an arts and cultural centre.

New Brunswick

 The Algonquin Resort in St. Andrews. It was featured by Creepy Canada.
 Blackville. The Dungarvon Whooper reputedly haunts this Dungarvon River, which runs in Miramichi near the Bartholomew River. It was featured by Mystery Hunters and Creepy Canada.
 Charlotte County Court House in St. Andrews. It was featured by Creepy Canada. 
 Fireship of Baie des Chaleurs is a 16th-century ship of forty Portuguese settlers that was set afire by a British army.

Newfoundland and Labrador
 Chez Briann Restaurant in St. John's, Newfoundland and Labrador. It was featured on Creepy Canada. 
 Newman Wine Vaults in St. John's. 
 Wabana Iron Ore Mines on Bell Island. It was featured on Creepy Canada.

Northwest Territories

 Nahanni National Park Reserve in Fort Simpson.

Nova Scotia

 Acadia University in Wolfville. An apparitional Baptist girl who found out about her pregnancy in the 19th century hanged herself in "The well", a large open area on the second floor (four-long) surrounded by banisters and under a candle light. Her ghost is most often seen by faculty staff members on the back stairwell at Seminary House's campus. Other paranormal activities are people having strange visions in this location, lights that turn on and off by themselves as well as doors opening and closing on their own, light anomalies, disembodied voices, objects moving by themselves and strange unexplained noises.
 All Saints Cathedral in Halifax. This church is allegedly haunted by one of the former deans. He is mostly standing at the altar.
 Bedford Basin in Halifax. This site is reportedly haunted by spirits of Native Canadians, French, British and Canadian soldiers and family members. There are touches, pushes and pulls by invisible presences, light anomalies, apparitional footsteps, shadowy figures disembodied voices and other unexplained noises.
 Citadel Hill in Halifax.
 Fortress of Louisbourg on Cape Breton Island. This massive fortress, constructed during the 1700s, was featured by Creepy Canada.
 Seal Island, an island on the outermost extreme of Southwestern Nova Scotia, in Municipalité Argyle in Yarmouth County. There is a local legend of a ghost from a shipwreck during 1891, the SS Ottawa. A stewardess named Annie Lindsey was believed drowned when her lifeboat overturned. She was buried beside the East End church where her grave marker can still be seen today. Some, however, believe that when the coffin was later disinterred, it showed evidence that she was buried alive. Her spirit is said to haunt the Seal Island villages.
 Young Teazer at Mahone Bay. Paranormal incidents have been reported by witnesses since it sunk on June 27, 1813. This ghostly burning schooner is seen by mariners on this bay. It is most often seen by visitors near the anniversary of this ship's fatal explosion in its historical location. Most witness reports state once seen it then just vanishes. It was featured by Creepy Canada.

Ontario
 Welland Canal, Bridge 13 in Welland. This bridge is said to be haunted by canal workers who perished during its construction, and no less than 7 people who have died trying to scale the bridge towers.
 Albion Falls in Hamilton. It was featured by Creepy Canada. 
 Algonquin Provincial Park in South Algonquin. Tom Thomson's spirit allegedly wanders through this wilderness. It was featured by Mystery Hunters and Creepy Canada. 
 Bytown Museum in Ottawa. This building is said to be haunted by Colonel John By, the builder of the canal, and his assistant General Duncan McNab. It was featured by Creepy Canada and The Girly Ghosthunters.
 Chateau Laurier in Ottawa. 
 Fairmont Royal York in Toronto. 
 Fort George in Niagara-on-the-Lake. It was one of Canada's strongholds during the War of 1812. It was featured by Creepy Canada and The Girly Ghosthunters.
 Fort Henry National Historic Site in Kingston. It was featured by Creepy Canada and The Girly Ghosthunters. 
 Gibraltar Point Lighthouse on Toronto Islands. The first lighthouse keeper, John Paul Radelmuller, was murdered by soldiers from nearby Fort York looking for bootlegged beer on January 2, 1815. These soldiers were charged with murder, but were eventually acquitted. A coffin was found in 1893 buried in the sand with a jawbone in it, however, it is not clear whether this was part of the lighthouse keeper's remains or not. It was featured by Creepy Canada.
 Grand Theatre in London. Ambrose Small's apparition reputedly roams this theatre. It was featured by Mystery Hunters and The Girly Ghosthunters.
 Hockey Hall of Fame in Toronto.
 Keefer Mansion in Thorold. It was featured by Creepy Canada. 
 Kingston Penitentiary in Kingston. It was featured by Creepy Canada. 
 Mackenzie Inn in Kirkfield. It was featured by Creepy Canada. 
 Mather-Walls House in Kenora. It was featured by Creepy Canada. 
 Ottawa Jail Hostel in Ottawa.  It was featured by Creepy Canada, The Girly Ghosthunters and Mystery Hunters.
 Screaming Tunnel in Niagara Falls.
 Old Fort Erie in Fort Erie. It was featured by Ghost Adventures. 
 Buck Hill in Round Lake, Ontario.
Texas Road in Amherstburg.
Weston & Highway 7 in Vaughan. This site is allegedly haunted by a 19th-century little girl who lost her life in a fire.
Whitby Junction Station in Whitby. Now an art gallery, it is said to be haunted by the former telegraph operator murdered at the railway station.
 Windermere House in Windermere.

Prince Edward Island
 Ghost Ship of Northumberland Strait is described as a beautiful schooner that has three masts (sometimes four masts, as reports vary) with pure white sails, all of which become completely engulfed in flames as onlookers watch. There never seems to be a predetermined place for where the ship will appear. Sightings have occurred throughout the seasons, but seem to be more prevalent from September to November. These visions are also apparent before a northeast wind, and folklore has it that this brilliant ghost ship is a forewarning of a storm.
 The Kings Playhouse in Georgetown, Prince Edward Island is said to be haunted by a naval captain and other spirits lost at sea. Originally built in the 1880s, the Playhouse served as a townhall and recreational facility. After a devastating fire in 1983, the theatre was rebuilt, but the hauntings continued. Spirits are said to often be seen near the stage, in the upstairs hallway, or heard whistling from afar. It was featured by Creepy Canada.

Quebec
 1234 De La Montagne in Montreal. It was featured by Creepy Canada. 
 Auberge Le Saint-Gabriel in Old Montreal. This site is allegedly haunted by a 19th-century little girl who lost her life in a fire.
 Cathedral of the Holy Trinity in Quebec City. It was featured by Creepy Canada. 
 Chateau Frontenac in Quebec City.
 Grey Nuns Motherhouse in Ville-Marie, Montreal. 
 John Abbott College in Montreal. This building is about 100 years old. Spirits allegedly roam around in a specific areas, opening doors. The spirits have been recognized by the janitors or guards, and by the students.
 McGill University in Montreal.
 Plains of Abraham in Quebec City. 
 Queen Elizabeth Hotel in Montreal.
 St. John's Shrewsbury Anglican Church in Gore.

Saskatchewan
 
 Assiniboia Club in Regina. It was featured by Creepy Canada. 
 Darke Hall in Regina. It was featured by Creepy Canada. 
 Fort Battleford in Battleford.
 Fort San in Fort Qu'Appelle.
 Government House in Regina.
 Gravelbourg School in Gravelbourg.
 Hopkins Dining Parlour in Moose Jaw. It was featured by Creepy Canada. 
 Moosehead Inn on Kenosee Lake.
 Marr Residence in Saskatoon. It was featured by Creepy Canada. 
 St. Louis, a village near Prince Albert, in which believers claim witnessed a railroad accident that killed an entire family, and the suicide of the guilt-ridden engineer responsible for the mishap.
 St. Paul's Hospital in Saskatoon.
 Saskatchewan Hospital in North Battleford. The original buildings of the hospital from the early 20th century, in the adjacent census subdivision of the North Battleford Crown Colony, still stand and had witnssed the most distressing conditions brought forth by extreme overcrowding. The fate of the old structures remain unknown, as the newer and more modern hospital was opened in March 14, 2019. 
 Souris Valley Mental Health Hospital, also known as Weyburn Mental Hospital, a now-demolished (since 2009) institution for mentally insane in Weyburn. One of the first institutions for such purpose in the 1930s, it was notorious for using cutting edge experimental medical treatments for people with mental health issues, including some of the controversial LSD treatments in Canada.

See also
List of reportedly haunted locations in the United States
List of reportedly haunted locations in France
Reportedly haunted locations in the United Kingdom

References

 
Canadian folklore
Lists of places in Canada
Canada
Lists of tourist attractions in Canada